The University of Zanjan  (ZNU) (Persian: دانشگاه زنجان Dāneshgāh-e Zanjan) is located in Zanjan, Iran. It was founded in 1975 and organized into four faculties. Nowadays it is one of the largest universities of the country with a community of over 10,000 students.

At the 2006 National Census, its population was 125 in 36 households. The following census in 2011 counted 2,229 people in 51 households. The latest census in 2016 showed a population of 3,881 people in 27 households; it was the largest locality in its rural district.

History
ZNU (the ex-Higher School for Agriculture & Animal Science) started its activities in 1975.          

In December 1975, as ratified by the state council, land with an area of 440 hectares was dedicated by the Forestry Organization to ZNU. On February 20, 1976 Zanjan Higher School for Agriculture & Animal Science started its work under the new title Zanjan Agriculture & Animal Science College while it enhanced its Agriculture & Animal Science Courses to a BS Level.

With a Council for the Expansion of Higher Education agreement (April 25, 1987) on enrolling students in the Engineering college, the council altered the Zanjan A&AS college title to a Center for Higher Education on May 8, 1987 (including Engineering and Agriculture colleges).

Following this the science and humanities colleges were established in 1990 & 1991, respectively, and the Ministry of Culture and Higher Education changed the center for higher school in Zanjan to University of Zanjan.

Zanjan University is one the Iran's most politically active college campuses and 2008 Zanjan University Protests gained international attentions and inspired other similar movements in schools and universities Women Lead Rallies.

Faculties and departments
The university has four faculties

Faculty of Engineering
 Department of Civil Engineering
 Department of Electrical Engineering
 Department of Mechanical Engineering
 Department of Computer Engineering
 Department of Surveying Engineering
 Department of Mining Engineering
 Department of Chemical Engineering
 Department of Metallurgical Engineering
 Department of Architecture
 Department of Painting

Faculty of Sciences
 Department of Physics
 Department of Mathematics
 Department of Chemistry
 Department of Geology
 Department of Biology
 Department of Statistics
 Department of Environmental science

Faculty of Humanities
 Department of Islamic History
 Department of Geography
 Department of Philosophy
 Department of Persian
 Department of Physical Education & Sport Sciences
 Department of English Language and Literature and Translation Studies
 Department of Accountancy
 Department of Islamic Mysticism
 Department of Psychology
 Department of Economic Sciences
 Department of Commercial Management
 Department of Industrial Management
 Department of Law

Faculty of Agriculture
 Department of Agricultural Extension, Communication and Rural Development
 Department of Agronomy & Plant Breeding
 Department of Animal Sciences
 Department of Food Industry
 Department of Horticulture
 Department of Irrigation
 Department of Plant Protection
 Department of Soil Sciences

World rankings
Times Ranking of World Universities
 2016: International rank : +801
Webometrics Ranking of World Universities
 2012: International rank : 2466, National rank : 26
Islamic World Science Citation Database Rankings
 2014: National rank : 19
 2013: National rank : 20
 2012: National rank : 20
 2011: National rank : 22
 2010: National rank : 29
GreenMetric overal ranking
 2017: World rank : 47
 2015: World rank : 69
 2014: World rank : 128

Notable people
 Sadollah Nasiri Gheydari is a physicist and professor at the university. He also was a reformist representative of Zanjan and Tarom County in the Islamic Consultative Assembly.
 Ali Ramazani is a chemist and professor at the university. He is one of the top researchers based on the ISI declaration (2011).
Institute for Advanced Studies in Basic Sciences (IASBS)
Islamic Azad University of Zanjan
Institute for Studies in Theoretical Physics and Mathematics (IPM)
Higher education in Iran
List of universities in Iran

Student Organizations 

 Islamic Association of Students
 Basij of Student

References

 

Educational institutions established in 1975

Zanjan County

Education in Zanjan Province

Buildings and structures in Zanjan Province

1975 establishments in Iran

Populated places in Zanjan Province

Populated places in Zanjan County